Lazlo Hollyfeld is an American art rock band from Buffalo, New York.

History
The band was formed in the winter of 2003 in Buffalo, New York. Bassist Chris Gangarossa and keyboardist Scott Molloy began focusing on creating a purely instrumental sound based on the ideas of simplicity, dominant rhythms and textures. After the addition of guitarist Jeff Mcleod and drummer Matt Felski, Lazlo Hollyfeld quickly became one of the most recognized groups in upstate New York. The band's name is a reference to the character played by Jon Gries in the 1985 film, Real Genius.

Their first album, Our Universe is Feeding, was released in 2004. In late 2005, the group released The Pacer EP, which contained rock songs with an electronic, soulful, and moody elements. The first track, "Everything You Know is Gone", is almost breakbeat rock, with its uplifting changes leading to a guitar that screams echoes. The heavily electro-inflected "Miss Hong", seamlessly blends into the title track, "The Pacer". Accompanying the release of the EP, Lazlo Hollyfeld played two extended United States tours, marked by appearances at South by Southwest, and two nights at The Boom Boom Room in San Francisco with Mike Clark and Robert Walters.

In November 2007, the band finished recording their third release, Elimination, an energy-packed album with a 1970s rock feel; keeping the band's instrumental and harmonious sound, but with violent, anger-driven instrumental themes. The fourth album, Desert, is a concept album released May 29, 2010.

Discography

Albums and EPs
Our Universe Is Feeding (2004)
The Pacer EP (2005)
Sailfish (2006)
Elimination (2007)
Desert (2010)

Footnotes
The name of the band is a reference to a character in the 1985 movie Real Genius starring Val Kilmer.

References

External links

Lazlo Hollyfeld @ SoundCloud

American post-rock groups
Musical groups from Buffalo, New York